Sergei Vladimirovich Ryzhikh or Serhiy Volodymyrovych Ryzhykh (born 12 September 1979) is a Russian-Ukrainian professional football coach and a former player.

Honours
Russian Second Division Zone East top scorer: 2001 (14 goals).

External links
 

1979 births
People from Horlivka
Living people
Russian footballers
Association football forwards
FC Baltika Kaliningrad players
FC Salyut Belgorod players
FC Hoverla Uzhhorod players
Russian expatriate footballers
FC Metallurg Lipetsk players
Ukrainian Premier League players
FC SKA-Khabarovsk players